The Men's 400 metre freestyle competition at the 2017 World Championships was held on 23 July 2017.

Records
Prior to the competition, the existing world and championship records were as follows.

Results

Heats
The heats were held at 09:43.

Final
The final was held at 17:32.

References

Men's 400 metre freestyle